Bosley Butte is a mountain in the Klamath Mountains of southwestern Oregon in the United States. It is located in southern Curry County in the extreme southwest corner of the state.

References

External links 
 

Buttes of Oregon
Mountains of Oregon
Mountains of Curry County, Oregon